Henry Payne Iba (August 6, 1904 – January 15, 1993) was an American basketball coach and college athletics administrator.  He served as the head basketball coach at Northwest Missouri State Teacher's College, now known as Northwest Missouri State University, from 1929 to 1933; the University of Colorado Boulder from 1933 to 1934; and the Oklahoma State University–Stillwater, known as Oklahoma A&M prior to 1957, from  1934 to 1970, compiling a career college basketball coaching record of 751–340. He led Oklahoma A&M to consecutive NCAA basketball tournament titles, in 1945 and 1946. 

Iba was also the athletic director at Oklahoma A&M / Oklahoma State from 1935 to 1970 and the school's head baseball coach from 1934 to 1941, tallying a mark of 90–41. As head coach of the United States men's national basketball team, he led the U.S. to the gold medals at the 1964 and 1968 Summer Olympics. Iba was inducted into the Naismith Memorial Basketball Hall of Fame in 1969.

Early life
Iba was born and raised in Easton, Missouri. He played college basketball at Westminster College, where he became a member of Lambda Chi Alpha fraternity. The basketball court at Westminster is now named in his honor.

Career
After coaching stints at Maryville Teachers' College (now Northwest Missouri State University) and the University of Colorado, Iba came to Oklahoma A&M College in 1934. He stayed at Oklahoma A&M, renamed Oklahoma State University in 1957, for 36 years until his retirement after the 1969–70 season. For most of his tenure at A&M/OSU, he doubled as athletic director. Additionally, Iba coached OSU's baseball team from 1934 to 1941.

Iba is thought to be one of the toughest coaches in NCAA history. He was a very methodical coach who expected things to be done perfectly. His teams were a reflection of his personality. They were methodical, ball-controlling units that featured weaving patterns and low scoring games. Iba's "swinging gate" defense (a man-to-man with team flow) was applauded by many, and is still effective in today's game. He was known as "the Iron Duke of Defense."

Iba's Aggies became the first to win consecutive NCAA titles (1945 and 1946). His 1945–46 NCAA champions were led by Bob Kurland, the game's first seven-foot player. They beat NYU in the 1945 finals and North Carolina in the 1946 finals. He was voted coach of the year in both seasons. His 1945 champions defeated National Invitation Tournament champion, DePaul, and 6'10" center George Mikan in a classic Red Cross Benefit game.
A&M/State teams won 14 Missouri Valley titles and one Big Eight title, and won 655 games in 36 seasons.

Iba's tenure crested in 1958. That year, the Cowboys joined (or rejoined, depending on the source) the Big Eight and promptly won the conference title, advancing all the way to the Elite Eight. However, after that season, his Cowboys only finished higher than fourth two more times in Big Eight play, one of which was another Elite Eight appearance in 1965.

All told, in 40 years of coaching, he won 767 games—the second-most in college basketball history at the time of his retirement. As OSU's athletic director, he built a program that won 19 national championships in 5 sports (basketball, wrestling, baseball, golf, cross-country) over the years.  After his retirement,  "Mr. Iba" (as he is still called at OSU) frequently showed up at practices, often giving advice to young players.

In 1987, OSU's home arena, Gallagher Hall, was renamed Gallagher-Iba Arena in Iba's honor.  A seat in the southeast concourse level of the arena is known as "Mr. Iba's Seat," and it is maintained without a fan having sat in it.

Olympic coaching
Iba coached the United States Olympic basketball team in 1964, 1968 and 1972. He is the first coach in U.S. Olympic basketball history to coach two gold medal-winning teams (1964 in 1964 Tokyo Summer Olympics and 1968 in 1968 Mexico City Summer Olympics). Coach Mike Krzyzewski became the second in 2012. At his third Olympics in charge in 1972, Iba led his team to another gold medal game, which resulted in a highly controversial 50–51 loss to the Soviet Union, breaking Team USA's 63-game winning streak in Olympic competition.

Honors and awards
Iba was elected to the Oklahoma Sports Hall of Fame, the Oklahoma Hall of Fame, the Missouri Hall of Fame, the Helms Foundation All-Time Hall of Fame for basketball, National Collegiate Basketball Hall of Fame (in 2006), FIBA Hall of Fame (in 2007) and Naismith Memorial Basketball Hall of Fame (in 1969) at Springfield, Massachusetts.

Iba was indirectly responsible for a $165 million donation to the Oklahoma State University athletic program. In 1951, T. Boone Pickens, a graduate of OSU with a degree in petroleum geology, was looking for a job and asked Iba for help. Iba set the young graduate up with two interviews for high-school basketball coaching jobs and although Pickens didn't end up becoming a coach, the favor Iba did for him was the impetus behind his decision 50 years later to make a $165 million donation to Oklahoma State University's athletic program.

Iba was inducted into the Oklahoma Hall of Fame in 1965.

Death
Iba died on January 15, 1993, in Stillwater, Oklahoma.

Legacy

Coaching tree
Iba is known for his coaching tree, the group of prominent coaches who either coached or played for Iba himself, or are linked to Iba by playing for one of his pupils. Coaches in this tree typically use a physical man-to-man defense and an offense predicated on ball movement and passing.

Henry Iba Award
The Henry Iba Award was established in 1959 to recognize the best college basketball coach of the year by the United States Basketball Writers Association. Five nominees are presented and the individual with the most votes receives the award which is presented in conjunction with the Final Four. The award is presented at the Oscar Robertson Trophy breakfast the Friday before the Final Four.

Henry P. Iba Citizen Athlete of the Year
In 1994, the Rotary Club of Tulsa established the Henry P. Iba Citizen Athlete of the Year Award to honor two athletes, one male and one female, which have exhibited or demonstrated excellence in their sport and in life. In 1997, the Rotary Club of Tulsa established the Henry P. Iba Citizen Athlete of the Year Award with additional acknowledgement by recognized by the Chairman's Award. Former New York Knicks player John Starks was the male winner of the award in 1997.

Portrayals
In 2017, John Savage portrayed Iba in the Russian sport drama Going Vertical, about the 1972 Olympic final.

Head coaching record

College basketball

See also
 List of college men's basketball coaches with 600 wins
 List of NCAA Division I Men's Final Four appearances by coach
 List of Oklahoma State University Olympians

References

External links

1904 births
1993 deaths
American men's basketball players
American Olympic coaches
Baseball coaches from Missouri
Basketball coaches from Missouri
Basketball players from Missouri
Centers (basketball)
Classen School of Advanced Studies alumni
College men's basketball head coaches in the United States
Colorado Buffaloes men's basketball coaches
FIBA Hall of Fame inductees
High school basketball coaches in Oklahoma
Naismith Memorial Basketball Hall of Fame inductees
Northwest Missouri State Bearcats men's basketball coaches
Oklahoma State Cowboys and Cowgirls athletic directors
Oklahoma State Cowboys baseball coaches
Oklahoma State Cowboys basketball coaches
People from Buchanan County, Missouri
United States men's national basketball team coaches
Westminster Blue Jays men's basketball players